American country music duo Brothers Osborne have released three studio albums, one live album, one extended play, nine singles, ten promotional singles, ten music videos and appeared on three albums. The sibling duo signed with Capitol Records Nashville in 2012 and issued their debut single the following year titled "Let's Go There". Their label followed it with "Rum", which appeared on their 2014 extended play. In 2015, the duo released their third single titled "Stay a Little Longer". It became their first major hit, reaching the top five of Billboard Hot Country Songs chart and certified platinum in sales. This was followed by their studio album in 2015 titled Pawn Shop, which debuted at number three on the Billboard Top Country Albums chart. The album also spawned the top 20 hit single "It Ain't My Fault".

In 2018, the duo released their second album titled Port Saint Joe. It became their highest-charting album to date, reaching number two on the Billboard country albums list. It spawned two top 40 singles: "Shoot Me Straight" and "I Don't Remember Me (Before You)". In 2019, they released their first live concert album titled Live at the Ryman. In October 2020, their third studio album was released called Skeletons. It debuted in the top five of the country albums chart and has since spawned the charting single, "All Night".

Albums

Studio albums

Live albums

Extended plays

Singles

As lead artist

As a featured artist

Promotional singles

Music videos

Other album appearances

Footnotes

References

External links
 Brothers Osborne discography and music at their official website

Discographies of American artists
Country music discographies